Rusyn, is an East Slavic language spoken by Rusyns in parts of Central and Eastern Europe, and written in the Cyrillic script. Within the community, the language is also referred to by the older folk term, or simply referred to as speaking our way. The majority of speakers live in an area known as Carpathian Ruthenia that spans from Transcarpathia, westward into eastern Slovakia and south-east Poland. There is also a sizeable Pannonian Rusyn linguistic island in Vojvodina, Serbia, as well as a Rusyn diaspora throughout the world. Per the European Charter for Regional or Minority Languages, Rusyn is officially recognized as a protected minority language by Bosnia and Herzegovina, Croatia, Hungary, Romania, Poland (as Lemko), Serbia, and Slovakia.

In the English language, the term Rusyn is recognized officially by the ISO. Other names are sometimes also used to refer to the language, mainly deriving from exonyms such as Ruthenian or Ruthene, that have more general meanings, and thus (by adding regional adjectives) some specific designations are formed, such as: Carpathian Ruthenian/Ruthene or Carpatho-Ruthenian/Ruthene.

The categorization of Rusyn as a language or dialect is a source of controversy. Czech, Slovak, and Hungarian, as well as American and some Polish and Serbian linguists treat it as a distinct language (with its own ISO 639-3 code), whereas other scholars (in Ukraine, Poland, Serbia, and Romania) treat it as a dialect of Ukrainian.

Geographic distribution 

In terms of geographic distribution, Rusyn language is represented by two specific clusters: the first is encompassing Carpathian Rusyn or Carpatho-Rusyn varieties, and the second is represented by Pannonian Rusyn.

Carpathian Rusyn is spoken in:
 the Zakarpattia Oblast of Ukraine.
 northeastern regions of Slovakia.
 southeastern regions of Poland. The variety of Rusyn spoken in Poland is generally known as Lemko language. 
 northeastern regions of Hungary.
 northern regions of Romania (in Maramureș).

Pannonian Rusyn is spoken by the Pannonian Rusyns in the region of Vojvodina (in Serbia), and in a nearby region of Slavonia (in Croatia).

History 

The Niagovo Postilla (Njagovskie poučenija), dated to 1758, is one of the earliest texts possessing significant phonetic and morphological characteristics of modern Rusyn (specifically the Subcarpathian variant) and is potentially "linguistically traceable" to the 16th century.

By the 18th century, the Rusyn language was "clearly in evidence" and "quite recognizable in a more systematic fashion".

The first books produced exclusively for Rusyn readership were printed under the direction of bishop of Mukachevo, Joseph Decamillis (r. 1690 - 1706). Under his direction, the printshop at the University of Trnava published a catechism (Katekhisis dlia naouki Ouhorouskim liudem, 1698) and an elementary language primer (Boukvar’ iazyka slaven’ska, 1699). For decades, these would be the only textbooks available to Rusyn students.

Later, in 1767 Maria Theresa's Urbarium was published throughout the Habsburg Empire in a variety of languages, including Rusyn.

Finally, under Bishop Andriy Bachynskyi's tenure (r. 1773 - 1809) in the Greek Catholic Eparchy of Mukachevo, new texts for Rusyn student readership were published. These several editions of Ioann Kutka's primer and catechism were published in Rusyn vernacular, though with  heavy influence from Church Slavonic.

19th century 

By the 19th century, "attempts to write in a form of Russo-Church Slavonic with a Rusyn flavor, or a type of 'Subcarpathian Russian' with Rusyn phonetic features," began to be made. Notably, Myxajlo Lučkaj's grammar of the Subcarpathian variety of Church Slavonic, Grammatica Slavo-Ruthena, of 1830 had a "distinctly Rusyn flavor". And while Lučkaj did not support use of vernacular as a literary language (commenting on the proper usage of either  in his Praefatio), he did include examples of "Rusyn paradigms" in his work to attempt demonstrate its similarity to Church Slavonic. Lučkaj in effect sought to prove the two languages were close sisters of a common ancestor. 

In 1847, Greek Catholic priest Alexander Dukhnovych published the first textbook written almost fully in common Rusyn vernacular, Knyzhytsia chytalnaia dlia nachynaiushchykh (A Reader for Beginners). Further editions of the primer followed in 1850 and 1852, as well as the establishment of "the first Carpatho-Rusyn cultural organization", the Prešov Literary Society, in 1850. Over the next four years of its existence, the Society would go on to publish a further 12 works, including Dukhnovych's Virtue is More Important than Riches (the very first play written in Carpatho-Rusyn), as well Carpatho-Rusyn's first literary anthologies in 1850, 1851, and 1852, titled Greetings to the Rusyns.

Classification 
The classification of the Rusyn language has historically been both linguistically and politically controversial. During the 19th century, several questions were raised among linguists, regarding the classification of East Slavic dialects that were spoken in the northeastern (Carpathian) regions of the Kingdom of Hungary, and also in neighbouring regions of the Kingdom of Galicia and Lodomeria. From those questions, three main theories emerged:

 Some linguists claimed that East Slavic dialects of the Carpathian region should be classified as specific varieties of the Russian language. 
 Other linguists argued that those dialects should be classified as western varieties of a distinctive Ukrainian language. 
 A third group claimed that those dialects are specific enough to be recognized as a distinctive East Slavic language.

In spite of these linguistic disputes, official terminology used by the Austro-Hungarian Monarchy that ruled the Carpathian region remained unchanged. For Austro-Hungarian state authorities, the entire East Slavic linguistic body within the borders of the Monarchy was classified as Ruthenian language, an archaic and exonymic term that remained in use until 1918.

20th century 

After the dissolution of Austria-Hungary (1918), the newly proclaimed Hungarian Republic recognized Rusyn regional autonomy in Subcarpathian regions and created, at the beginning of 1919, a department for Rusyn language and literature at the Budapest University.

By the end of 1919, the region of Subcarpathian Ruthenia was appended to the newly formed Czechoslovak state, as its easternmost province. During the next twenty years, linguistic debates were continued between the same three options (pro-Russian, pro-Ukrainian, and local Rusyn), with Czechoslovak state authorities occasionally acting as arbiters.

In March 1939, the region proclaimed independence under the name Carpatho-Ukraine, but it was immediately occupied and annexed by Hungary. The region was later occupied (1944) and annexed (1945) by the Soviet Union, and incorporated into the Ukrainian SSR, which proceeded with implementation of Ukrainian linguistic standards. In Soviet Ukraine, Rusyns were not recognized as a distinctive ethnicity, and their language was considered a dialect of Ukrainian language. Poland employed similar policies, using internal deportations to move many Eastern Slavs from southeastern to newly acquired western regions (Operation Vistula), and switch their language to Polish, and Ukrainian at school.

During that period, the only country that was officially recognizing the Rusyn minority and its language was Yugoslavia.

Post-Soviet developments 

After the dissolution of the Soviet Union in 1991, modern standards of minority rights were gradually applied throughout the Eastern Europe, thus affecting the attitude of several states towards the Rusyn language. As successors of Yugoslavia, Serbia and Croatia continued to recognize the Rusyn language as an official minority language.

Scholars with the former Institute of Slavic and Balkan Studies in Moscow (now the Institute of Slavonic Studies of the Russian Academy of Sciences) formally acknowledged Rusyn as a separate language in 1992, and trained specialists to study the language. These studies were financially supported by the Russian Academy of Sciences.

Since 1995, Rusyn has been recognized as a minority language in Slovakia, enjoying the status of an official language in municipalities where more than 20 percent of the inhabitants speak Rusyn.

Contemporary status 

Ukrainian state authorities do not recognize Rusyns as a separate ethnicity, regardless of Rusyn self-identification. Ukraine officially considered Rusyn a dialect of Ukrainian. In 2012, Ukraine adopted a new law, recognizing Rusyn as one of several minority and regional languages, but that law was revoked in 2014.

Rusyn is recognized as an officially protected, minority language by the European Charter for Regional or Minority Languages in Bosnia and Herzegovina (2011), Croatia (1997), Hungary (1998), Romania (2008), Poland (as Lemko, 2009), Serbia (2006), and Slovakia (2002).

It is not possible to estimate accurately the number of fluent speakers of Rusyn; however, their number is estimated to be in the tens of thousands.

ISO 639-9 Identifiers 

The International Organization for Standardization (ISO) has assigned the ISO 639-3 code 'rue' for Carpathian Rusyn.

Varieties

Carpathian Rusyn varieties 
The main continuum of Rusyn varieties stretches from Transcarpathia and follows the Carpathian Mountains westward into South-Eastern Poland and Eastern Slovakia, forming an area referred to as Carpathian Ruthenia. As with any language, all three major varieties of Rusyn vary with respect to phonology, morphology, and syntax, and have various features unique to themselves, while of course also containing their own, more local sub-varieties. The continuum of Rusyn is agreed to include the varieties known historically as Lemko and Bojko, and is also generally accepted to end at or with the Hucul variety, which is "not included in the Rusyn continuum per se, but represent[s] a linguistic variant .. better seen as a dialect of Ukrainian". As the westernmost member of the family of East Slavic languages, it has also acquired a number of West Slavic features—unique to East Slavic languages—due to prolonged contact with the coterritorial languages of Polish and Slovak.

Literary languages 
Today, there are three formally codified Rusyn literary varieties and one de facto (Subcarpathian Rusyn). These varieties reflect the culmination of nearly two centuries of activist and academic labor, during which a literary Rusyn language was desired, discussed, and addressed (time and again) by a dedicated intelligentsia. Linguist Stefan M. Pugh notes, "...at every stage someone was thinking of writing in Rusyn; approximately every generation a grammar of some sort would be written but not find wide acceptance, primarily for reasons of a political nature (and of course logistical practicalities)."

Some of these earlier grammars include those by Dmytrij Vyslockij (Karpatorusskij bukvar), Vanja Hunjanky (1931), Metodyj Trochanovskij (Bukvar: Perša knyžečka dlja narodnıx škol; 1935), and Ivan Harajda (1941). Harajda's grammar is particularly notable for having arrived in the midst of a five-year linguistic furvor for Carpatho-Rusyn. From 1939 through 1944 an estimated 1,500 to 3,000 Rusyn-language publications (mostly centered around Uzhhorod, Ukraine) entered print and from 1941 onward, Harajda's grammar was the accepted standard.

 Prešov Rusyn 
In Slovakia, the Prešov literary variety has been under continuous codification since 1995 when first published by Vasyl Jabur, Anna Plíšková and Kvetoslava Koporová. Its namesakes are both the city and region of Prešov, Slovakia—historically, each have been respective centers for Rusyn academia and the Rusyn population of Slovakia.

Prešov Rusyn was based on varieties of Rusyn found in a relatively compact area within the Prešov Region. Specifically, the variety is based on the language spoken in the area between the West Zemplin and East Zemplin Rusyn dialects (even more specifically: a line along the towns and villages of Osadne, Hostovice, Parihuzovce, Čukalovce, Pcoline, Pichne, Nechvalova Polianka, Zubne, Nizna Jablonka, Vysna Jablonka, Svetlice, and Zbojne). And though the many Rusyn dialects of Slovakia entirely surpass the limited set of features prescribed in the standard, this comparatively small sample size was consciously chosen by codifiers in order to provide a structured ecosystem within which a variety of written and spoken language would inevitably (and already did) thrive.

Its orthography is largely based on Zhelekhivka, a late 19th century variety of the Ukrainian alphabet.

 Lemko-Rusyn 
In Poland, a standard Lemko-Rusyn grammar and dictionary were published in 2000 by Mirosława Chomiak and Henryk Fontański, with a second edition issued in 2004.

 Subcarpathian Rusyn 
In Transcarpathia, Ukraine, M. Alamašij's and Igor Kerča's Materyns'kyj jazyk - pysemnycja rusyns'koho jazyka, serves as the de facto literary standard for Subcarpathian, though "unofficial". Published in 1999, with a second edition in 2004, and a 58,000 word Rusyn-Russian dictionary in 2007, Kerča's work has been used by prominent Rusyn publishers in Uzhorod—albeit with variations between published works that are typical of the spoken language.

 Common usage 

Despite the above codified varieties, many Carpatho-Rusyn publications will use a combination of the three Carpathian standards (most notably in Hungary and in Transcarpathia). There have even attempts to revitalize the pre-war etymological orthography with archaic Cyrillic orthography (i.e. usage of the letter ѣ, or yat); the latter can be observed throughout Rusyn Wikipedia, where even a single article may be written in several different codified varieties. And while somewhat archaic, used of Harajda's grammar is even promoted by some in Rusyn Wikipedia (although parts of the articles are written using other standards).

 Pannonian Rusyn 

Pannonian Rusyn, has variously been referred to as an incredible distinct dialect of Carpathian Rusyn or a separate language altogether. In the ISO 639-9 identifier application for Pannonian Rusyn (or "Ruthenian" as it is referred to in that document), the authors note that "Ruthenian is closest to [a] linguistic entity sometimes called [ ,  ], ... (the speeches of Trebišov and Prešov [districts])."

 Literary language 
The literary variety of Serbian and Croatian Rusyns is, again, significantly different from the above three Carpathian varieties in both vocabulary and grammar. It was first standardized in 1923 by G. Kostelnik. The modern standard has been continuously developed since the 1980s by Julian Ramač, Helena Međeši and Mihajlo Fejsa of Serbia, and Mihály Káprály of Hungary.

 Phonology 

 Consonants 

A soft consonant combination sound [] exists more among the northern and western dialects. In the eastern dialects the sound is recognized as [], including the area on which the standard dialect is based. It is noted that a combination sound like this one, could have evolved into a soft fricative sound [].

 Vowels 

 // and // tend to be more towards centralized as [], [].

 Grammar 

 Noun declension 

Declension in Rusyn is based on grammatical number, gender, and case. Like English, only two types of grammatical number are expressed: singular and plural. And like other Slavic languages, Rusyn has three grammatical genders: feminine, masculine, and neuter. Furthermore, like those languages, Rusyn uses a seven-case system of nominative, accusative, genitive, dative, locative, instrumental, and vocative cases.

One final point of note is that the masculine gender (and only the masculine gender) is further subdivided into animate and inanimate types. While there are no suffixes specific to animacy, declension between the two differs in that for animates, the form of the accusative case copies that of the genitive case.

 Grammatical cases 

As mentioned in the preceding section, Rusyn cases are similar to those of other Slavic languages. A very general summary of usage is given in the table below, though proper usage depends on a particular situation, prepositions, and verbs used, as well as other extenuating circumstances.

Nouns will generally decline differently to indicate each case (e.g. English they/them/their/theirs). Based on how they decline, nouns can be grouped into one of four "types".
 Type I: feminine nouns ending in -а/-я in the nominative singular
 Type II:
 masculine nouns ending in a consonant in the nominative singular
 neuter and masculine nouns ending in a consonant or -o in the nominative singular
 neuters ending in -e or -а/-я in the nominative singular
 Type III:
 feminine nouns ending in a paired consonant (-cons.+ь), an unpaired palato-alveolar consonant (-ш, -ч, щ, -ж, or -дж), or -ов in the nominative singular
 the feminine noun  
 Type IV: neuter nouns ending in -а/-я in the nominative singular

 Declension type I: feminines ending in -а/-я 
This type consists of grammatically feminine nouns ending in -а (hard) or -я (soft) in the nominative case. The table below includes four examples of such nouns. The first two represent the archetypal feminine paradigm, while the second two represent a "common" or "two-fold gender" paradigm.

It is important to note that this second paradigm has atypical dative, locative, and instrumental singular suffixes which are actually representative of the male/neuter declension paradigm (visible later in this article). According to Pugh, this peculiarity developed as a result of the societal roles of "judge" and "elder" being traditionally patriarchal. In these cases, the typical feminine paradigm is maintained.

 Declension type II: masculines and neuters 
This declension type encompasses a very large set of vocabulary as it contains nouns of both masculine and neuter genders, hard and soft stems, as well as animate and inanimate beings (for the masculine gender).

 Masculines ending in consonants 
This declension contains a large amount of identical forms (syncretism) between cases. Depending on the noun, the number of distinct forms may number from as few as 3 to as many as 6. For singular animate nouns, there is a single form for the accusative and genitive cases, as well as a single form for the dative and locative cases. Similarly, singular inanimate nouns share a form for nominative and locative cases.

 Neuters or masculines ending in -o, neuters ending in -e or -а/-я 
The following table demonstrates the declension paradigm for nouns with hard stems which end in -o in the nominative case. Though there are some masculine nouns in this category, these nouns are predominantly neuter.

 Declension type III: other feminines 
All nouns in this type are feminine. The paradigm can be identified by the following suffixes in the nominative singular case: a paired consonant (-cons.+ь), an unpaired palato-alveolar consonant (-ш, -ч, щ, -ж, or -дж), or the suffix -ов. Additionally, the noun  is also part of this type.

 Declension type IV: neuters ending in -а/-я 
This declension paradigm is used very rarely. It entirely consists of grammatically neuter nouns. This paradigm can be identified by the -a suffix in the nominative and accusative cases, as well as the appearance of the affix -t- between the stem and suffix in other cases. There is no variation in this paradigm: all nouns decline in an identical manner.

Type IV is predominantly made up of words referring to the young of animals and humans. However, this should not be taken as a hard rule as some nouns which historically declined differently (e.g.  and ), now decline according to this paradigm instead.

 Verbal conjugation 

Verbs may be divided into two major conjugation types, which may be identified based on the "stem-marker" that appears during conjugation. Unfortunately, the infinitive verb forms are often ambiguous and as such, there is no general system that allows an infinitive to be identified as either Type I or Type II. Some infinitive suffixes, however, are unique to at least Type I, i.e. -ути, -овати, -нути, etc. In the following sections, the stem-markers are given in Latin as Cyrillic often obscures the markers in the conjugated forms.

 Conjugation type I Type I may be divided into several sub-types, the most notable of which are the vowel+j stem-markers: -uj-, -ij-, -yj-, etc. It is important to remember that in the infinitive and some conjugations that the consonant, -j-, is truncated when followed by another consonant, e.g. -aj-ty → -a-ty.

 UJ stem markers 
The -uj- set of verbs can be divided into two groups based the presence of the suffixal markers -ova- or -uj-''' in the infinitive. The former group representing the overwhelming majority of verbs in this type.

 IJ stem markers 

 YJ stem markers 

 ЫJ stem markers 

 A(J) stem markers 

 AVA stem markers 

 A stem markers 

 NU stem markers 

 Non-syllabic stem markers 

 Consonant stems 

 Conjugation type II 

 Y-type I 

 Y-type II 

 I-type 

 Palato-Alveolar Stems 

 Irregular Verbs 

Alphabet

Each of the Rusyn standard varieties has its own Cyrillic alphabet. The table below shows the Rusyn alphabet of the Prešov Standard, with notes on other varieties. The alphabets of the other Carpathian Rusyn varieties, Lemko Rusyn and Subcarpathian Rusyn, differ from the Prešov Standard in lacking ё and ї. For the Pannonian Rusyn alphabet, see .

Romanization (transliteration) is given according to ALA-LC, BGN/PCGN, generic European, ISO/R9 1968 (IDS), and ISO 9.

 Usage notes 
{{Ordered list | list_style_type=lower-alpha
|  Not used in Lemko.
|  Not used in Pannonian Rusyn.
|  The Pannonian Rusyn alphabet places this letter directly after з, like the Ukrainian alphabet.
According to ALA–LC romanization, it is romanized i for Pannonian Rusyn and y otherwise.
|  "Soft Sign": marks the preceding consonant as palatalized (soft) 
|  "Hard Sign": marks the preceding consonant as NOT palatalized (hard).
| In Ukraine, usage is found of the letters о̄ and ӯ.
This letter is still used in part of the articles in the Rusyn Wikipedia.
| The letters о̂ and ӱ is used formally.}}

Number of letters and relationship to the Ukrainian alphabet

The Prešov Rusyn alphabet of Slovakia has 36 letters. It includes all the letters of the Ukrainian alphabet plus ё, ы, and ъ.

The Lemko Rusyn alphabet of Poland has 34 letters. It includes all the Ukrainian letters with the exception of ї, plus ы and ъ.

The Pannonian Rusyn alphabet has 32 letters, namely all the Ukrainian letters except і.

Alphabetical order

The Rusyn alphabets all place ь after я, as the Ukrainian alphabet did until 1990. The vast majority of Cyrillic alphabets place ь before э (if present), ю, and я.

The Lemko and Prešov Rusyn alphabets place ъ at the very end, while the vast majority of Cyrillic alphabets place it after щ. They also place ы before й, while the vast majority of Cyrillic alphabets place it after ш, щ (if present), and ъ (if present).

In the Prešov Rusyn alphabet, і and ї come before и, and likewise, і comes before и in the Lemko Rusyn alphabet (which doesn't have ї). In the Ukrainian alphabet, however, и precedes і and ї, and the Pannonian Rusyn alphabet (which doesn't have і) follows this precedent by placing и before ї.

Newspapers

 Amerikansky Russky Viestnik (defunct)Besida, a Lemko journalKarpatska Rus'Lem.fm, Gorlice, Poland
 Lemko, Philadelphia, US (defunct)Narodnȳ novynkȳ (Народны новинкы)
 Podkarpatská Rus (Подкарпатська Русь)
Ruske slovo (Руске слово), Ruski Krstur, SerbiaRusnatsi u Shvetse (Руснаци у Швеце)
 Rusynska besida (Русинська бесіда)

See also

 Alexander Duchnovič's Theatre
 Eastern Slovak dialects
 Petro Trochanowski, contemporary Rusyn poet
 Metodyj Trochanovskij, Lemko Grammarian
 Iazychie
 Rusyn was added to Minecraft as an interface language option

 Notes 

References

Sources

  
 
  
 
 
 
 Aleksandr Dmitrievich Dulichenko. Jugoslavo-Ruthenica. Роботи з рускей филолоґиї.'' Нови Сад 1995.
 
 Геровский Г.Ю. Язык Подкарпатской Руси – Москва, 1995
 
 
 Taras Kuzio, "The Rusyn question in Ukraine: sorting out fact from fiction", Canadian Review of Studies in Nationalism, XXXII (2005)

External links

 The World Academy of Rusyn Culture: 'Language of Carpatho-Rusyn'
 Rusyn-Ukrainian Dictionary
 Lemko-Rusyn Language Course (in Polish and Lemko)
 Rusyn Greco Catholic Church in Novi Sad (Vojvodina-Serbia)

Rusyns
Rusyn language
East Slavic languages
Rusyn culture
Languages of Ukraine
Languages of Poland
Vulnerable languages